Aqua: The Videos is a compilation of Aqua's music videos, released in 1998. It includes four videos, representing the band's 1997 singles, though not in chronological order of release.

Track listing
"Barbie Girl"
"Doctor Jones"
"My Oh My"
"Lollipop"

Personnel
Lene Nystrom Rasted – female vocals
Rene Dif – male vocals
Soren Nystrom Rasted – keyboard, guitar
Claus Norreen – keyboard

External links
Official website

Aqua (band) video albums
1998 video albums
Music video compilation albums
1998 compilation albums